Rhytisma is a genus of fungi in the Rhytismataceae family commonly known as 'tar spot'. There are about 18 species, which live parasitically in the leaves of deciduous trees.

Species

Rhytisma acerinum
Rhytisma americanum
Rhytisma andromedae
Rhytisma anhuiense
Rhytisma asteris
Rhytisma decolorans
Rhytisma eucalypti
Rhytisma himalense
Rhytisma huangshanense
Rhytisma ilicis-canadensis
Rhytisma ilicis-integrae
Rhytisma ilicis-latifoliae
Rhytisma ilicis-pedunculosae
Rhytisma itatiaiae
Rhytisma lagerstroemiae
Rhytisma panamense 
Rhytisma prini
Rhytisma priscum
Rhytisma punctatum
Rhytisma salicinum
Rhytisma ulmi
Rhytisma umbonatum
Rhytisma velatum
Rhytisma vitis
Rhytisma yuexiense

References

Leotiomycetes
Leotiomycetes genera
Taxa named by Elias Magnus Fries
Taxa described in 1818